ALTO (Analyzed Layout and Text Object) is an open XML Schema developed by the EU-funded project called METAe.

The standard was initially developed for the description of text OCR and layout information of pages for digitized material. The goal was to describe the layout and text in a form to be able to reconstruct the original appearance based on the digitized information - similar to the approach of a lossless image saving operation.

ALTO is often used in combination with Metadata Encoding and Transmission Standard (METS) for the description of the whole digitized object and creation of references across the ALTO files, e.g. reading sequence description.

The standard is hosted by the Library of Congress since 2010 and maintained by the Editorial Board initialized at the same time.

In the time from the final version of the ALTO standard in June 2004 (version 1.0) ALTO was maintained by CCS CCS Content Conversion Specialists GmbH, Hamburg up to version 1.4.

Versions
The latest schema version and an overview about all versions with the links to the schema can be found at https://github.com/altoxml

Structure
An ALTO file consists of three major sections as children of the root  element:
  section contains metadata about the ALTO file itself and processing information on how the file was created.
  section contains the text and paragraph styles with their individual descriptions:
  has font descriptions
  has paragraph descriptions, e.g. alignment information
  section contains the content information. It is subdivided into  elements.
<?xml version="1.0"?>
<alto>
  <Description>
    <MeasurementUnit/>
    <sourceImageInformation/>
    <Processing/>
  </Description>
  <Styles>
    <TextStyle/>
    <ParagraphStyle/>
  </Styles>
  <Layout>
    <Page>
      <TopMargin/>
      <LeftMargin/>
      <RightMargin/>
      <BottomMargin/>
      <PrintSpace/>
    </Page>
  </Layout>
</alto>

See also
 Metadata Encoding and Transmission Standard (METS)
 Dublin Core, an ISO metadata standard
 Preservation Metadata: Implementation Strategies (PREMIS)
 Open Archives Initiative Protocol for Metadata Harvesting (OAI-PMH)
 hOCR

References

External links
 ALTO (Analyzed Layout and Text Object) standards on Library of Congress website
 https://altoxml.github.io/ resp. https://github.com/altoxml ALTOxml on GitHub 
 More info about METS/ALTO by CCS GmbH
 METS ALTO Introduction by CCS GmbH 
 XSLT-Transformations from and to ALTO

XML
Markup languages
Technical communication
Open file formats
Metadata